Kara Eve Taitz (born May 11, 1981) is an American actress, who starred as Lily Miran, a socially awkward and sex-crazed girl who has feelings for the main character on the sitcom The Hard Times of RJ Berger. Her on-screen debut was as Millicent, a recurring character on The Suite Life of Zack & Cody. Millicent was a quirky candy counter girl who often fainted out of panic. Other appearances include episodes of Samantha Who?, where she appeared in 2007 after graduating Tisch School of the Arts, Wizards of Waverly Place and the USA television-movie Operating Instructions as Christine Lahti's meek, lovestruck assistant.

Early life
Born and raised in New York City, New York, Taitz developed a knack for performing in early childhood. According to MTV's official website, she "sang before she could talk." Taitz attended Fiorello H. LaGuardia High School (New York's High School for the Performing Arts) and NYU's Tisch School of the Arts. In 2003, she was the lead actress in the play "Til Death Do Us Part," by Jay C. Rehak.

Filmography

TV

Film

References

External links

Kara Taitz at MTV.com

Living people
1981 births
American television actresses
Actresses from New York City
Tisch School of the Arts alumni